Vaa Raja Vaa is a 1969 Indian Tamil-language children's film written, directed and produced by A. P. Nagarajan for CNV Productions. The film features an ensemble cast including Master Prabhakar, Baby Sumathi, Sirkazhi Govindarajan, V. S. Raghavan, K. D. Santhanam and Suruli Rajan. It was released on 6 December 1969 and became a commercial success. The film was remade in Telugu as Balaraju Katha (1970), with Prabhakar reprising his role.

Plot 

Raja is a 10-year-old tourist guide in Mahabalipuram. An elder sculptor has a small rock sculpture tablet on which are engraved adages. Raja enters a discussion with him, wondering if those pearls of wisdom still hold relevance. The sculptor tells him that those sayings are eternal and immortal. Unconvinced, Raja sets out to find the truth for himself. Ultimately, he realises that all those sayings are still valid.

Cast 
 Master Prabhakar as Raja
 Baby Sumathi as Raja's sister
Sirkazhi Govindarajan as a police officer disguised as a sage
V. S. Raghavan
K. D. Santhanam as the elder sculptor
Suruli Rajan as a friendly police officer

Production 
In addition to writing and directing, A. P. Nagarajan also produced Vaa Raja Vaa under his company CNV Productions. W. R. Subba Rao was the cinematographer, while T. R. Nagarajan was the editor. Since it was previously believed in the Tamil film industry that A. P. Nagarajan's films were successful only because of their star cast and "mammoth" scales, rather than his directorial skills, he directed this film, which featured mostly newcomers, to silence his critics. It was also one of his rare films to have a contemporary setting, since he was then known primarily for directing films based on Hindu mythology. The film was shot entirely on location in Mahabalipuram.

Soundtrack 
The music was composed by Kunnakudi Vaidyanathan, marking his cinematic debut. The lyrics were written by Arulmani, Poovai Senguttuvan, Ulundurpettai Shanmugham and Azha Valliappa.

Release and reception 
Vaa Raja Vaa was released on 6 December 1969. The film was a commercial success, running for over 100 days in theatres. In a review dated 21 December 1969, the Tamil magazine Ananda Vikatan praised the performances of the cast. The film was remade in Telugu as Balaraju Katha (1970), with Prabhakar reprising his role.

References

Bibliography

External links 
 

1960s children's films
1960s road movies
1960s Tamil-language films
1969 films
Films directed by A. P. Nagarajan
Films scored by Kunnakudi Vaidyanathan
Indian children's films
Indian road movies
Tamil films remade in other languages